Ralph J. Furey (June 16, 1903 – November 14, 1984) was an American college athlete, football coach, and college athletics administrator.  He served as the athletic director at Columbia University from 1943 to 1968.   Furey was born in New York City on June 16, 1903.  He attended Brooklyn Preparatory School, before playing football and baseball at Columbia.  Furey was the captain of the Columbia's football team in 1927.

References

1903 births
1984 deaths
Columbia Lions athletic directors
Columbia Lions football players
Columbia Lions football coaches
Columbia Lions baseball players
Brooklyn Preparatory School alumni
Baseball players from New York City
Players of American football from New York City